Clarendon Hotel may be:

 Clarendon Hotel, Christchurch, New Zealand
 Clarendon Hotel, Oxford, England
 Clarendon Hotel, Quebec City, Canada
 The Clarendon Hotel, Hammersmith, London
 Clarendon Hotel, Green Cove Springs, Florida, United States, Florida